Gwyn Ashton (born 1960, Wales) is a Welsh–Australian blues/rock guitarist and singer-songwriter.

Biography
The Welsh-born and singer-songwriter/guitarist Gwyn Ashton migrated to Adelaide, South Australia in the 1960s, picked up a guitar at 12 and at 16 started his musical journey, playing bars and festivals across the country.

Moving to Sydney in the 80s Gwyn Ashton was one-time lead guitarist for Stevie Wright and Swanee and in the 90s he moved to Melbourne and played on two of The Masters Apprentices Jim Keays' solo albums. Ashton opened for Rory Gallagher, Junior Wells and various blues bands from the US when they came to Australia. Encouraged by Billy Thorpe to jam with Mick Fleetwood, Ashton was instantly on the short list for replacing Rick Vito in Fleetwood Mac which never eventuated due to the reformation of the Buckingham/Nicks lineup. 
 
After relocating and playing the European circuit for three years by 2001 the now Virgin Records France recording artist Gwyn Ashton was nominated at third position as ‘Guitarist of The Year’ in Guitar Part Magazine. First and second positions were Jeff Beck and Gary Moore, fourth was Popa Chubby, fifth was Guns N' Roses Izzy Stradlin. Ashton's first gig in France was opening for Buddy Guy with ex Rolling Stones Mick Taylor on before Gwyn. Ashton questioned this and said 'we don't deserve to be on after Mick. It's the wrong way around' but the organisers insisted on this as his popularity in France had grown. Ashton then played the Paris Music Trade Show where Fender France presented him with a new Stratocaster.

With numerous worldwide radio appearances under his belt, in the '90s Ashton appeared live on a radio show in Kent, England with Bert Jansch. He played on a derelict Dutch train carriage on the pirate station Radio London in the Netherlands and networks in Australia including various ABC stations and public radio. He was also interviewed and played a live performance in France on Paris Inter.
 
Ashton then co-headlined Garden Blues Festival in Marseille with Robben Ford and on the bill with Ray Charles at Cognac Blues Passions. At this time Ashton had two of his albums simultaneously in the Amazon France Top 100 charts. He has played many guitar and blues festivals including two appearances at the Acoustic Festival of Great Britain, Popkomm in Berlin, Guitar Heroes Festival in Germany with Mick Taylor and has conducted blues masterclasses at London's Guitar Institute, Guitar X and Academy of Sound in Birmingham and Exeter, England. Ashton also played the 10th annual ’Thanks Jimi’ Festival in Wroclaw, Poland onstage with Bernie Marsden and Jimi Hendrix's brother Leon Hendrix, leading 8000 guitarists playing ‘Hey Joe’ in the market square setting a new ‘Guinness Book of World Records’.
 
For five years Ashton was Gerry McAvoy's choice for fronting the Rory Gallagher celebratory group Band of Friends, replacing Thin Lizzy/Motorhead guitarist Brian Robertson. They headlined the first two Ballyshannon Rory Gallagher Festivals with members of The Dubliners opening for them. Rory's brother Donal was taken aback by Ashton's interpretation of his late brother's guitar playing stating ‘I like the way you put your own slant on Rory's music, you don't just copy him’. The band consisted of Gerry, Lou Martin, Brendan O’Neill, Mark Feltham and Dennis Greaves, all who at the time played in the band Nine Below Zero. Gerry and Brendan played on Ashton's ‘Fang It! album with Greaves producing it. The album received great reviews and won many awards for ‘Album of The Year’ in a host of magazines.
 
Italian guitar company Liutart then asked Ashton to design his own signature guitar which he uses to this day with the configuration based on his favourite classic guitars – Gibson Firebird, Danelectro and Fender Telecaster pickups. Ashton called this 'the ultimate slide guitar'.
 
Since then Ashton has been touring Europe with many acts including The Yardbirds, Johnny Winter, Peter Green, Slade, The Sweet, Canned Heat, Magnum, The Troggs and headlining his own shows. He has also played dates in England with Van Morrison, Robin Trower, Jeff Healey, Tony Joe White, Walter Trout and 15 arena shows, including Wembley, with the legendary Status Quo with Francis Rossi asking him about co-writing and Rick Parfitt wanting some slide guitar tips. Ashton has shared the bill twice with Joe Bonamassa, once at Birmingham NEC for Music Live and once at a guitar festival in Sweden. Ashton has performed at guitar shows appeared twice on Czech National TV, ZDF TV in Germany and in Bulgaria on Slavi's Show, Slavi being the 'Bulgarian Jay Leno' with an audience of two million. This coincided with Ashton's concert for the American Chamber of Commerce celebrating American Independence Day, 50 years of Bulgarian occupancy and the 50th anniversary of the Stratocaster, the show being organised by Fender Bulgaria 4 July 2004.
 
Three years running he played at Deep Purple keyboardist Don Airey's charity show near Cambridge, England with members of Whitesnake Bernie Marsden, Mickey Moody and Neil Murray, plus Uli John Roth, Robert Hart and Jimmy Page's first choice for Led Zeppelin vocalist Terry Reid. Don has played on two of Ashton's albums ‘Prohibition’ (alongside Chris Glen and Ted McKenna from Sensational Alex Harvey Band, Ian Gillan, Michael Schenker Group) and ‘Radiogram’ which also features guest appearances from Kim Wilson (Fabulous Thunderbirds), Robbie Blunt (Robert Plant), Mark Stanway (Magnum, Phil Lynott's Grand Slam) and Mo Birch (Robert Plant, Go West, Paul Rodgers, Culture Club). Ashton has recorded eight albums, some with special guests mentioned above.  
 
Ashton has been invited onstage with some of the greatest blues and rock musicians, including ex-Black Crowes Marc Ford, who also asked him to play lap steel on a studio session in Los Angeles. They also played three duo shows together.  He jammed with Walter Trout, the legendary Canned Heat and Hubert Sumlin at blues festivals in England and Germany, bassist extraordinaire Jerry Jermott (BB King, Aretha Franklin) and Cactus and former Vanilla Fudge bassist Tim Bogert in Los Angeles and he even sat around David Crosby's dining room table trading licks on acoustic guitar with the former Byrd's legendary singer, songwriter. Jackson Browne and Robert Plant have both commented favourably on Ashton's playing and both been part of his audience. Ashton has even been known to sit around former Rainbow and Alcatraz singer Graham Bonnet in his living room, playing and singing Beatles songs together! He's also played with Steely Dan's Elliott Randal and former Jethro Tull's Mick Abrahams at a fund-raising show in England. Tull's former drummer Clive Bunker was Ashton's first UK drummer, and Ashton played two shows with ex-Rick Wakeman singer Gary Pickford-Hopkins.
 
During a tour of Spain, Ashton found himself jamming with former Wings drummer Geoff Britten who played on ‘Venus and Mars’. In Austin Texas, he was invited onstage with the hierarchy of the Austin scene including Derek O’Brien, Malford Milligan, Chris Duarte, Roscoe Beck and Frosty.
 
Eric Johnson's bassist Chris Maresh joined Ashton on a 2018 German tour with Welsh drummer Chris Sharley from the 70s band Sassafrass. Budgie's Burke Shelley gave Ashton a CD to learn their songs as they were possibly looking for a replacement guitarist at one stage. Shelley's blues band opened for Ashton at a Christmas party at Tawe Delta Blues Club in Swansea, Wales. They were introduced by Dire Straits and Rockpile drummer Terry Williams.

Ashton's first Czech Republic gig was with BB King at Golem Blues Festival where he was the only other musician, apart from King's band, allowed in the dressing room prior to King's performance. 
 
Ashton's first Czech Republic gig was with BB King at Golem Blues Festival, where he was the only other musician, apart from King's band members, allowed in the dressing room before his performance. Ashton has recorded eight albums, some with special guests mentioned above.  
 
Forever pushing the boundaries of his abilities, Gwyn Ashton's critically acclaimed latest release ‘Solo Elektro’ sees him reinvented as an alternative progressive blues-rock solo artist with elements of 1960s garage rock, psychedelia, acoustic roots, dance and chill-out music and some good old-fashioned rock 'n' roll. The album has garnished great reviews from lifestyle magazine Paris Move, Classic Rock Magazine, Powerplay Rock and Metal Magazine, RnR and Australia's Rhythms Magazine who stated ‘Throw Pink Floyd, The Beatles circa ’66 and Rory Gallagher into one big fuzz-filled concoction and there lays Gwyn Ashton's one-man band’.

His 2019 album Sonic Blues Preachers was recorded with John Freeman from the band Fraternity which boasted the frontman Bon Scott, pre-AC/DC. 

An inductee into the South Australian Music Hall of Fame for recognition of his contribution of sharing original Australian music with the world, Ashton is one of the most uniquely contemporary one-man acts on the planet today. His show is retro with a modern evolution as he crosses the boundaries between indie rock and the blues, mixing his electric set with acoustic lap side and steel-bodied resonator guitars along the way. His two-hour show takes his audience on an eclectic musical mesmerising story-telling journey, as he engulfs and engages them in a hypnotic musical adventure, showing music has no boundaries.

In October 2021, Ashton came under scrutiny for his harassment of local tribute bands in his hometown of Adelaide, South Australia. Ashton and his recording partner and local AC/DC cover band artist Brett Leeming, attended a Zep Boys and Just Floyd concert at Thebarton Theatre after posting on social media they would be attending to harass tribute band fans. RJ Frometa of Vents magazine wrote: "The only negative thing about the night was nothing to do with the bands or their performance. Upon leaving the show I was accosted by local blues guitarist (and anti-tribute band activist) Gwyn Ashton who was forcing flyers upon people, and begging concert goers to purchase tickets to his upcoming shows. Recently Ashton and his friend, a Bon Scott/AC DC cover artist Brett Leeming have come under scrutiny for attacking people on social media who support local cover bands and artists. It was sad seeing a SA Hall of Fame inductee resorting to standing outside other band’s events, when he should have been out performing his own. My advice to Gwyn would be to focus on your own work rather than attacking everyone else’s and maybe one day you can sell out Thebarton Theatre, just like Zep Boys and Just Floyd."

Band
Gwyn Ashton – solo.

Sonic Blues Preachers – recording project with John Freeman on drums – ex Bon Scott's Fraternity in 1971. Live with former Paul McCartney and Wings drummer Geoff Britton.

Chris Finnen & Gwyn Ashton – roots, blues and beyond acoustic/electric duo with Ashton on lap slide, resonator slide and various guitars. Finnen on guitars and African, Indian and Turkish percussion and stringed instruments.

Critics

"(Solo Elektro) Pure Genius. A masterpiece. The solo album Syd Barrett should have made."- Paris Move, France

"His most interesting work to date. A kaleidoscope of sonic directions. Howling blues perfection yet still stands out as curiously contemporary." – RnR magazine, UK

"All killer, no filler. I dare you not to be surprised and delighted with Solo Elektro. 7/8". – Powerplay Rock and Metal, UK

"Dripping attitude and explosive raw energies, Solo Elektro is a hearty slice of music from one of Australia’s most cherished blues rock artists" – Rhythms, Australia

"A reinvention for the Australian troubadour. Solo Elektro is ambitiously written, with tracks running the gamut between alt.blues, stoner rock and Eastern-tinged, Lennon-voiced psychedelia.'- Classic Rock Magazine, UK.

"South Australia's greatest contribution to blues-rock." – billboard.com

"This duo march into battle taking on every blues-rock trick in the book, successfully blasting them to a new level. No-nonsense, brutal and invigorating" – Guitar & Bass

"(Gwyn Ashton) blends the essences of Mississippi, New Orleans and Texas blues, 60s surf, British 70s rock and no-holds-barred Australian kick-ass boogie ... (He is) guaranteed to satisfy the most discriminating taste in guitar-led blues." (Review of his album "Prohibition" at CD Baby)

"Prohibition is a strong, powerful and dark, energetic and charged with electricity Blues-Rock ... probably the best Blues/Rock album of 2006" (Review at Bluescat)

Awards
In 2001, French Guitar Part Magazine voted Gwyn Ashton third best guitarist of the year, beaten by Jeff Beck and Gary Moore.

In 2007, his album Prohibition was voted 'Album of the Year' by the British Guitar and Bass magazine.

Endorsements
Ashton is endorsed by:
 Fender (Australia)
 Vigier Guitars (France)
 Busker Guitars (UK)
 Mutron
 Vintage Guitars
 Morley
 National Reso-Phonic Guitars
 Seymour Duncan Pickups
 Hiscox Cases
 BMF Effects
 Graph-Tech Industries
 Award-Session
 Dunlop Strings

Discography
 Feel the Heat (1993)
 Beg, Borrow & Steel (1996)
 Fang it ! (1999)
 Prohibition (2006)
 Two-Man Blues Army (2009)
 Radiogram (2012)
 Ragas, Jugs & Mojo Hands (Australia-only 2016)
 Solo Elektro (2017)
Sonic Blues Preachers (2019)

References

External links
 BBC Music Artist Entry
 Official website
 Myspace page1
 Myspace page2
 [ Allmusic] entry for Gwyn Ashton
 Riverside Records, Gwyn Ashton's previous label (not to be confused with Riverside Records)
 2016 Interview – Australian Rock Show Podcast

1961 births
Living people
Australian blues guitarists
Australian male guitarists
Australian rock guitarists